XHZN-FM is a radio station in Zamora, Michoacán. Broadcasting on 88.1 FM, XHZN is owned by the successors of José Laris Iturbide and carries the Los 40 national format.

History
XHZN received its concession on May 30, 1980, originally specifying 92.1 MHz, a month after beginning operations. The station moved frequencies in the early 2000s.

External links
Los-40-Zamora Facebook

References

Radio stations in Michoacán